Uptown Lexington Historic District is a national historic district located at Lexington, Davidson County, North Carolina. The district encompasses 52 contributing buildings, 3 contributing sites, and 1 contributing object in the central business district of Lexington.  It includes commercial and governmental buildings built between 1824 and 1946. Located in the district is the separately listed Old Davidson County Courthouse. Other notable buildings include the former United States Post Office (1911-1912), Raper Building (c. 1907), Moffitt Building (1920s), Smith-Thompson Block (1900), the Development Building (c. 1905), the Buchanan-Siceloff Building (1923-1929), the Hinkle Block (1902-1907), the Hankins Building (1902), Hedrick's Hall (1902), and the Earnhardt Building (1923-1929).

It was added to the National Register of Historic Places in 1996.

References

Historic districts on the National Register of Historic Places in North Carolina
Renaissance Revival architecture in North Carolina
Neoclassical architecture in North Carolina
Buildings and structures in Davidson County, North Carolina
National Register of Historic Places in Davidson County, North Carolina